The Williams–Powell House is a historic plantation house located at Orrum, Robeson County, North Carolina.  It was built about 1830, and is a two-story, frame dwelling with a rear kitchen ell, in a transitional Federal / Greek Revival style.  It has a gable roof and flanking exterior end chimneys.  The front facade features a free-standing two-story portico, which shelters the first and second story porches.

It was added to the National Register of Historic Places in 1984.

References

Plantation houses in North Carolina
Houses on the National Register of Historic Places in North Carolina
Greek Revival houses in North Carolina
Federal architecture in North Carolina
Houses completed in 1830
Houses in Robeson County, North Carolina
National Register of Historic Places in Robeson County, North Carolina
1830 establishments in North Carolina